The Colorado Altitude were a women's professional softball team based in Littleton, Colorado.  They were part of the founding roster of National Pro Fastpitch teams in 2004.

History

During the NPF's 2003 All-Star tour, the league announced the addition of a team in the Denver, Colorado area.  The owners were Danny Stroud and Claud York.  The team was named the Colorado Altitude and expected to play at All City Stadium in Denver.  Long-time UCLA softball coach and WPF Orlando Wahoos coach Sharron Backus was to be the coach of the Altitude.

The Altitude were assigned to the NPF's West Division, along with the San Antonio Armadillos, Arizona Heat, and California Sunbirds.  The East Division included NY/NJ Juggernaut, New England Riptide, Akron Racers and Texas Thunder.

In March 2004, NPF released its inaugural schedule for the year and did not include the Armadillos and the Altitude.  The Altitude announced that it was their decision not to join the league in 2004, citing various concerns and leaving open the possibility of considering playing in NPF in 2005.  However, the only 2005 expansion team was the Chicago Bandits, and NPF has yet to add a full-time member in Colorado.

Players
The Altitude participated in NPF's inaugural Elite Draft and Senior Draft.  The following players were drafted by Colorado:

References

External links 
 
 The Softball Channel

Sports teams in Denver
Defunct sports teams in Colorado
Defunct softball teams in the United States
Defunct National Pro Fastpitch teams
Sports clubs established in 2004
2004 establishments in Colorado
2004 disestablishments in Colorado
Sports clubs disestablished in 2004
2004 in American women's sports
2004 in women's softball
Women's sports in Colorado